Mediaweek may refer to:

 Mediaweek (American magazine), a defunct magazine based in New York
 Mediaweek (Australian magazine), based in Potts Point, New South Wales
 Media Week, a defunct magazine folded into Campaign in 2013